Badar Ali Al-Mahruqy (born 12 December 1979), commonly known as Badar Al-Mahruqy, is an Omani footballer who plays for Muscat Club in the Oman First Division League.

Club career statistics

International career
He was part of the first team squad of the Oman national football team till 2004. Badar was selected for the national team for the first time in 1997. He has made appearances in the 2002 FIFA World Cup qualification, the 2004 AFC Asian Cup qualification and 2006 FIFA World Cup qualification.

References

External links

Badar Al Mahruqy at Goal.com

1979 births
Living people
Omani footballers
Oman international footballers
Association football defenders
2004 AFC Asian Cup players
Fanja SC players
Muscat Club players
Footballers at the 1998 Asian Games
Asian Games competitors for Oman